Suresh H. Moolgavkar M.D., Ph.D. (born 3 January 1943 in Bombay, India) was a mathematician and epidemiologist at the University of Washington and the Fred Hutchinson Cancer Research Center in Seattle. He is currently a Senior Fellow and Research Scientist at Exponent, a consulting firm.  Among his many scientific contributions is the development of the two-stage clonal expansion (TSCE) model of carcinogenesis, also known as the Moolgavkar-Venzon-Knudson (MVK) model, a stochastic cell-level description of carcinogenesis based on Alfred G. Knudson’s two-hit hypothesis. In its original development the TSCE model  represents tumor initiation as the first hit, followed by cell proliferation (clonal expansion) and malignant transformation as the second hit. It has been interpreted as describing the initiation-promotion-progression sequence observed in chemical carcinogenesis and has been applied widely for the analysis of both experimental and epidemiological data for purposes of quantitative risk assessment.

References

1943 births
Living people
20th-century Indian mathematicians
20th-century Indian medical doctors
20th-century American mathematicians
American epidemiologists
Cancer researchers
Medical doctors from Mumbai
Indian medical researchers
Indian emigrants to the United States
Fred Hutchinson Cancer Research Center people